The 2020 Lamar Hunt U.S. Open Cup tournament proper featured teams from all five tiers of the men's American soccer pyramid.

Qualification for the 2020 tournament included local qualifying matches contested by 88 teams, with a majority being amateur, and took place in late 2019 from September to November. One team also qualified by winning the 2019 National Amateur Cup, and other clubs playing in national leagues that are not fully professional qualified based on their results in 2019 league play.

The Open Division Local Qualifying tournament was launched in 2016 as an alternative to holding state and regional qualifying tournaments. Now, all teams from any US Soccer-affiliated leagues just need to register. The competition begins in the fall and all entrants are divided up regionally to minimize travel, with the teams that advance the furthest qualifying for the Lamar Hunt US Open Cup which will begin in the spring.

National Amateur Cup

Newtown Pride FC defeated Horizon FC, 4–0, on Saturday, August 3, to win the 2019 National Amateur Cup and qualify for the 2020 U.S. Open Cup.

National league track

National Premier Soccer League
The NPSL ranked its 87 eligible U.S.-based clubs based on results of its 2019 season for the purposes of qualification for the 2020 U.S. Open Cup.

The NPSL champion earned the top ranking, and the other finalist is second. The national semifinal loser from the region with the larger number of teams is ranked third, and the remaining national semifinalist is ranked fourth. The four regional final losers are ranked fifth through eighth based on the number of teams in their region, from largest to smallest. The remaining ranks are allocated among the regions based on their sizes and ensuring each of the NPSL's conferences has at least one team represented.

Due to a number of teams either leaving the NPSL or being unable to field a team due to the March 2020 tournament start, the following teams denied their invitations into the tournament: Miami FC (National Champion), New York Cosmos B (National Runner-up), Detroit City FC (quarterfinalist), Midland-Odessa Sockers FC, Chattanooga FC, and Brooklyn Italians.

The teams that qualified, in order of regional ranking, were:

USL League Two
USL League Two elected to use the results of the 2019 USL League Two season to rank its 67 U.S.-based teams for the purposes of qualification for the 2020 U.S. Open Cup. The highest placing teams from each division, provided that they are American, are ranked first in order of points. The remaining teams are then ranked based on points regardless of division. The 2019 USL League Two regular-season standings tiebreaker system is invoked when needed.

Due to the tournament starting in late March 2020, two teams that would have qualified for the tournament opted to decline their invitations. The 2019 National Finalist Reading United AC and the National Champion Flint City Bucks both announced they would not take part in the Open Cup. Reading's decline breaks the club's record streak of consecutive U.S. Open Cup appearances at 12. Additionally, Mid-South Division champion Brazos Valley Cavalry FC also declined its invitation while Colorado Pride Switchbacks U23, the Mountain Division champion, folded following the season.

The rankings of the USL League Two teams for 2020 U.S. Open Cup qualification are shown in the table below.

Local qualifying
U.S. Soccer originally announced that 89 teams would participate in local qualifying, however this number was reduced to 88 before the start of round one. The teams represented 18 different states and the District of Columbia (21 different state associations) and featured teams from 26 different leagues. For the fifth year in a row, the most represented league was the United Premier Soccer League which entered 33 teams, which was two fewer than the 35 they entered in the previous year's competition, and six fewer than the 39 that participated in the 2018 qualifying tournament. Of the 88 teams, 53 had competed in the Open Division tournament before, leaving 35 new teams.

First qualifying round
The draw for the first qualifying round took place on August 26 with 42 matches originally being scheduled and five teams receiving byes into round two. However, due to one team being disqualified from the competition, three additional teams were given byes and the total number of matches was decreased to 40 on September 11. Most of the games were played on September 21 and 22. One game was postponed due to inclement weather and was later played on September 28.

East Region

Received bye to second round of qualification:
Christos FC 
Federal City Wanderers 
New York Pancyprian Freedoms 
United German Hungarians 
Virginia United

Central Region

Notes:

Received bye to second round of qualification:
Ann Arbor FC 
Nashville United 
Springfield FC

West Region

Second qualifying round
The draw for the second qualifying round took place on September 23. Most of the games were played on October 19 and 20. One game was postponed due to inclement weather and was played on November 2.

East Region

Central Region

Notes:

West Region

Third qualifying round
The draw for the third qualifying round took place on October 21. The games were played on November 23 and 24. It was originally stated that a fourth qualifying round may be necessary on the weekend of December 21–22, however U.S. Soccer announced in late November that the twelve winners from this round will advance to the first round proper.

East Region

Central Region

West Region

Top goalscorers 

Source

See also
2019 NPSL season
2019 USL League Two season

References

External links
 U.S. Soccer Federation

U.S. Open Cup
2019 in American soccer